Konstantinos Englezakis (born 20 March 2001) is a Greek swimmer. He has qualified to represent Greece at the 2020 Summer Olympics in the men's 800 metre freestyle event.

References 

2001 births
Living people
Greek male swimmers
Greek male freestyle swimmers
Swimmers at the 2020 Summer Olympics